Propiophenone (shorthand: benzoylethane or BzEt) is an aryl ketone. It is a colorless, sweet-smelling liquid that is insoluble in water, but miscible with organic solvents. It is used in the preparation of other compounds.

Production
Propiophenone can be prepared by Friedel–Crafts reaction of propanoyl chloride and benzene. It is also prepared commercially by ketonization of benzoic acid and propionic acid over calcium acetate and alumina at 450–550 °C:
C6H5CO2H + CH3CH2CO2H → C6H5C(O)CH2CH3 + CO2 + H2O

Ludwig Claisen discovered that α-methoxystyrene forms this compound when heated for an hour at 300 °C (65% yield).

Uses

It is an intermediate in the synthesis of the pharmaceuticals phenmetrazine and propoxyphen.

References

Aromatic ketones
Phenyl compounds